Marowijne may be referring to any one of the following:
Marowijne District
Marowijne River